This article is about the list of most populated cities in Andhra Pradesh state of India as per 2011 Census of India, conducted by The Office of the Registrar General and Census Commissioner, under Ministry of Home Affairs, Government of India.

Cities statistics 

As per 2011 Census of India, towns with population of 100,000 and above are called Cities.

Visakhapatnam is the most populated city with a population of 2,335,922 after merger of surrounding towns of Bheemunipatnam and Anakapalle Municipalities into Visakhapatnam Municipal Corporation (VMC) and it was upgraded to Greater Visakhapatnam Municipal Corporation (GVMC). Proposals to merge some near by villages to Vijayawada, Kakinada, Tirupati and Rajamahendravaram Municipal Corporations.

Visakhapatnam, Kakinada, and Tirupati are being developed as Smart cities by Government of India under Smart Cities Mission.

The cities written in bold are the headquarters of their respective district.
                                                                                                                                                                                                                                                                                                                                                                                                                                                                   
This is a 2011 Population Census of M / M.Corp + O.G.of cities. (M - Municipality, M.Corp - Municipal Corporation, O.G. - Out Growths)

 Kurnool includes Kallur Village which was merged into Kurnool Municipal Corporation.
 Guntur includes ten villages namely Adavitakkellapadu, Ankireddypalem, Gorantla, Chowdavaram, Etukuru, Nallapadu, Pedakakani, Pedapalakaluru, Pothuru which were merged into Guntur Municipal Corporation.

Sources 
Source: STATISTICAL INFORMATION OF ULBs & UDAs  also Office of the Registrar General and Census Commissioner (web), Delimitation Commission of India (web), Rand McNally International Atlas 1994, School of Planning & Architecture (web) - https://www.citypopulation.de/php/india-andhrapradesh.php

https://censusindia.gov.in/2011census/dchb/2811_PART_A_DCHB_SRIKAKULAM.pdf

https://censusindia.gov.in/2011census/dchb/2812_PART_A_DCHB_VIZIANAGARAM.pdf

https://censusindia.gov.in/2011census/dchb/2813_PART_A_DCHB_VISAKHAPATNAM.pdf

https://censusindia.gov.in/2011census/dchb/2814_PART_A_DCHB_EAST%20GODAVARI.pdf

https://censusindia.gov.in/2011census/dchb/2815_PART_A_DCHB_WEST%20GODAVARI.pdf

https://censusindia.gov.in/2011census/dchb/2816_PART_A_DCHB_KRISHNA.pdf

https://censusindia.gov.in/2011census/dchb/2817_PART_A_DCHB_GUNTUR.pdf

https://censusindia.gov.in/2011census/dchb/2818_PART_A_DCHB_PRAKASAM.pdf

https://censusindia.gov.in/2011census/dchb/2819_PART_A_DCHB_SRI%20POTTI%20SRIIAMULU%20NELLORE.pdf

https://censusindia.gov.in/2011census/dchb/2823_PART_A_DCHB_CHITTOOR.pdf

https://censusindia.gov.in/2011census/dchb/2820_PART_A_DCHB_YSR.pdf

https://censusindia.gov.in/2011census/dchb/2821_PART_A_DCHB_KURNOOL.pdf

https://censusindia.gov.in/2011census/dchb/2822_PART_A_DCHB_ANANTAPUR.pdf

https://www.newindianexpress.com/states/andhra-pradesh/2013/feb/11/22-villages-may-be-included-in-rajahmundry-soon-449459.html

http://smartcities.gov.in/upload/uploadfiles/files/AndraPradesh_Kakinada.pdf

https://timesofindia.indiatimes.com/city/vijayawada/CRDA-eyes-CSR-funds-to-push-job-potential-in-capital-city/articleshow/47891827.cms

See also 
List of urban agglomerations in Andhra Pradesh
List of cities in India by population
List of municipalities in Andhra Pradesh

Notes

References 
https://www.deccanchronicle.com/nation/current-affairs/300517/ap-to-develop-14-smart-cities-across-state.html

Lists of populated places in Andhra Pradesh
Andhra Pradesh